The first generation Proton Perdana is a four-door mid-size family saloon manufactured by Malaysian automobile producer Proton which launched on 26 January 1995. It is a badge engineered seventh generation Mitsubishi Eterna, developed as the result of a collaboration between Proton and Mitsubishi Motors. About 80,000 first generation Proton Perdana were sold between 1995 and 2013.

Perdana is the Malay word for Prime.

History

Proton Perdana (1995-1998) 

The Malaysian economy grew at an average of 8% each year between the late 1980s and the first half of the 1990s. Proton identified the need for a larger, more luxurious D-segment car after the launch of the B-segment Proton Saga and C-segment Proton Wira in 1985 and 1993 respectively. When it launched on 26 January 1995, the Proton Perdana became Malaysia's first car to compete against the Toyota Camry, Honda Accord and Nissan Cefiro. The Perdana was the third car developed under Proton's extensive collaboration with Mitsubishi Motors. It is based on the seventh generation Mitsubishi Eterna platform and shared a vast majority of parts with the JDM-spec Eterna, receiving only minor internal and external changes for the Malaysian market. The Perdana features Mitsubishi's 4G63 16-valve 2.0 litre I4 multi-point fuel injected engine which is capable of producing 135 hp at 6000 rpm and 176 Nm of torque at 4750 rpm. It was initially offered with a four-speed automatic and a five-speed manual transmissions, but the manual variant was discontinued in 1996. The Perdana sported an extremely low drag coefficient of just 0.29 Cd, allowing for improved fuel efficiency and a top speed in excess of 200 km/h. The Perdana also became Proton's first car to be offered with an anti-lock braking system (ABS) and cruise control, and among the earliest of Protons to be equipped with all-round power windows, power folding mirrors and a headlight levelling system.

Proton struggled to meet the overwhelming demand for the Perdana upon its January 1995 launch, with a waiting period of over six months. The Perdana costed around RM85,000 at launch, but there were reports of relatively new second-hand Perdana units appreciating up to 12%, or RM95,000. Nonetheless, Proton still captured 47% of the 2,000cc and above segment in its domestic market, with 9,000 units sold over the course of 14 months.

In 1997, the Perdana was given a minor facelift, offering a chrome-plated grille, redesigned alloy rims, as well as additional colour options and upgraded interior trimmings.

A bulletproof edition of the Proton Perdana was used in the shuttling of the Heads of Government during the 1998 Asia-Pacific Economic Cooperation (APEC) summit in Kuala Lumpur.

Proton Perdana V6 (1998-2010) 

On 12 November 1998, Proton unveiled the  Proton Perdana V6 at Stadium Putra, Bukit Jalil. The Proton Perdana V6 is the same as the original Perdana, but equipped with the superior 24-valve Mitsubishi 6A12 2.0L V6 engine which offers 148 hp, or 13 hp more than the previous 16-valve Mitsubishi 4G63 2.0L Inline-four engine. The Perdana V6 received additional ride & handling input from Proton's British subsidiary, Lotus, resulting in improved NVH attributes. It also featured a new bodykit, grille, 16" rims, leather seats, a redesigned steering wheel and other minor updates on the interior and two exterior colours; silver and black. The original Perdana was sold alongside the V6 variant, but it was eventually discontinued in early 2000.

Proton had also introduced the Perdana V6 in neighbouring Brunei and Singapore on 11 and 22 June 1999 respectively.

The Perdana V6 was given a major facelift on 26 January 2003. It received a new front grille similar to an Alfa Romeo, front and rear bumpers, 16-inch alloy rims, tail lights and reverse lamps which were repositioned to the boot. Interior-wise, it featured a new steering wheel, redesigned leather seats and new aluminium-effect trim panels. The mechanical aspects of the car remained unchanged. From 2005 onwards, the Perdana V6 was offered with a new cream coloured interior option and more alluring nine-spoke 16" rims. This iteration remained on sale up until early 2010.

Proton managed to sell more than 77,178 units of the Perdana. Of the total sold, the 2.0 litre 6A12 V6 variant was the most commercially successful at between 50,000 and 55,000 sold whereas the 2.0 litre 4G63 I4 managed around 24,370, of which 11,570 and 9,617 were SEi and GLi automatic models, while the remaining 3,183 units made up the rare GLi manual version.

Automotive Conversion Engineering (ACE), a subsidiary of Edaran Otomobil Nasional (EON) and a company which specializes in the development of limousines and TD2000 cars produced the Proton Perdana V6 Executive, an extended wheelbase variant offering an additional  in the rear passenger compartment. A special edition of the Executive was also developed, featuring a specially designed "mobile office" themed console box, a 6.5 inch LCD TV and a VCD player. Additionally, two Proton Perdana V6 Limousine variants were released offering extended wheelbases of  respectively over the original Perdana V6, and sported far more luxury equipment compared to the Executive variant.

The Proton Perdana V6 is widely used by the Malaysian government and to a lesser extent, the Royal Malaysia Police. Some foreign embassies in Malaysia also use the Perdana V6 as diplomat cars. Known foreign embassies, consulates or high commissions that have invested in the Malaysian-made Proton Perdana V6 include Palestine.

The Perdana was only sold in its domestic market and immediate neighbouring countries. However, a handful of Perdana and Perdana V6 units were exported to the United Kingdom to serve Proton's top British executives. The Perdana was also tested by Britain's Top Gear magazine in their April 1999 issue and there were plans to sell the Perdana V6 in Europe. However, such plans failed to materialize due to the 1997 Asian financial crisis and Proton's subsequent withdrawal from mainland Europe. Between 1998 and 1999, Proton also had intentions to market the Perdana with a 2.5-litre version of the V6 engine in Australia, but no such launch occurred.

On 12 April 2001, The Straits Times reported that Perdana V6s sold throughout Singapore were placed under a recall order due to problems with the steering and suspension system with the ball joints.

Specifications

Notes

References 

Perdana
Cars introduced in 1995
2000s cars